Broadwood may refer to:

A surname
 Henry Fowler Broadwood (181193), English piano maker, son of James Shudi Broadwood
Henry Broadwood, 1793 or 1795 to 1878, son of John, Conservative MP
 James Shudi Broadwood (17721851), English piano maker, son of John Broadwood
 John Broadwood (17321812), Scottish piano maker
 John Broadwood (song collector) (17981864), English folk song collector, son of James Shudi Broadwood
 Lucy Broadwood (18581929), English folk song collector, daughter of Henry Fowler Broadwood
 Robert George Broadwood (18621917), British general, grandson of John Broadwood
A place name
 Broadwood (constituency), of Wan Chai District Council, Hong Kong
 Broadwood Stadium, a football stadium in Cumbernauld, Scotland and the home of Clyde F.C.
 Broadwood, New Zealand, a town
 Broadwood, Western Australia, a suburb of Kalgoorlie which includes a street of the same name
Other uses
 Broadwood and Sons, an English piano manufacturer, named after John Broadwood

See also